Yalvigi is a city in Karnataka, India.

Cities and towns in Gadag district